The women's 100 metres hurdles event at the 1988 World Junior Championships in Athletics was held in Sudbury, Ontario, Canada, at Laurentian University Stadium on 29 and 30 July.

Medalists

Results

Final
29 July
Wind: -2.6 m/s

Semifinals
30 July

Semifinal 1

Wind: +1.5 m/s

Semifinal 2

Wind: +3.8 m/s

Repechage Heat
29 July
Wind: -0.8 m/s

Heats
29 July

Heat 1

Wind: -1.3 m/s

Heat 2

Wind: -0.9 m/s

Heat 3

Wind: -1.8 m/s

Heat 4

Wind: -2.2 m/s

Participation
According to an unofficial count, 28 athletes from 19 countries participated in the event.

References

100 metres hurdles
Sprint hurdles at the World Athletics U20 Championships